Grodno (Hrodna), a city in Belarus.

Grodno may also refer to:

Grodno, Greater Poland Voivodeship (west-central Poland) 
Grodno, Toruń County in Kuyavian-Pomeranian Voivodeship (north-central Poland)
Grodno, Włocławek County in Kuyavian-Pomeranian Voivodeship (north-central Poland)
Grodno, Łódź Voivodeship (central Poland)
Grodno, West Pomeranian Voivodeship (north-west Poland)
Grodno Castle (Poland), Lower Silesian Voivodeship